1961 in professional wrestling describes the year's events in the world of professional wrestling.

List of notable promotions 
Only two promotions held notable shows in 1961.

Calendar of notable shows

Championship changes

EMLL

NWA

Debuts
Debut date uncertain:
The Beast
Ernie Ladd 
Gino Brito
Ivan Koloff
Jack Lanza
Jonathan Boyd
Luke Graham
S. D. Jones
Spiros Arion
Tony Parisi
Wahoo McDaniel
April  Umanosuke Ueda
July 4  Les Thatcher
July 16  Dr. Wagner

Births
Date of birth uncertain:
Vladimir Petrov
Penny Mitchell 
Eli the Eliminator 
January 24: 
Reggie Bennett
Kōji Iibashi 
January 24  Vince Russo
February 1  Sean Royal
February 9  Chris Walker 
February 17  Chris Champion(died in 2018)
February 21  Rhonda Singh(died in 2001)
March 9  Rick Steiner
March 17  La Fiera(died in 2010)
March 27  Octagón
April 11  Nobuaki Kakuda 
April 15  Volk Han
April 18  Brooklyn Brawler
April 23  Terry Gordy(died in 2001)
April 25  Giant Gustav (died in 2019) 
April 28  Billy Joe Travis(died in 2002)
May 4  Scott Armstrong
May 5  Hiroshi Hase
May 8  Akira Taue
May 11  Paul Diamond
May 13  Dennis Rodman 
May 14  Tommy Rogers(died in 2015)
May 16  The Godfather
May 25  Hiro Saito
June 9:
Bull Pain 
Despina Montagas
June 15  Scott Norton
June 21  Count Grog
July 9  Damián 666
July 13  Chris Michaels
July 25  Jaguar Yokota 
July 28  Ciclón Ramírez
July 30  El Brazo (died in 2013) 
August 13  Tony Falk
August 14  Eddie Gilbert(died in 1995)
August 17  Buddy Landel(died in 2015)
August 25  Nick Kiniski
September 1  Bam Bam Bigelow(died in 2006)
September 2  Mongolian Mauler
September 6  Wendi Richter
September 8  Rex King(died in 2017)
September 16  Phil LaFon
September 17 Jim Cornette
October 1:
Súper Astro
Rico Constantino
October 3  Maxx Payne
October 4  Bobby Fulton
October 11  Tony Chimel
October 14  Tom Burton (died in 2010) 
October 23:
Ron Harris
Don Harris
November 8  Isao Takagi
November 19  Rick Bassman
November 26  Ivory (wrestler)
December 19  Reggie White(died in 2004)
December 21  The Patriot (died in 2021) 
December 24  Peter Smit (died in 2005) 
December 30 Armand Rougeau

Deaths
February 18  Chick Garibaldi, 46
October 7  Al Mills 51

References

 
professional wrestling